Ensomheden, meaning 'Loneliness' in the Danish language, is an uninhabited island in southeastern Greenland. Administratively it is part of the Sermersooq municipality.
The weather of the island is characterized by tundra climate.

Geography
Ensomheden is an island in the Bernstorff Fjord of the King Frederick VI Coast, located between the Odinland Peninsula to the north and the Thorland Peninsula to the south. The waters around the island are mostly clogged by ice calved by the active glaciers at the head of the fjord.

Bibliography
Spencer Apollonio, Lands That Hold One Spellbound: A Story of East Greenland, 2008

See also
List of islands of Greenland

References

External links
Picture of Ensomheden in the middle of Bernstorff Fjord
Evidence for the asynchronous retreat of large outlet glaciers in southeast Greenland at the end of the last glaciation
Den grønlandske Lods - Sejladsanvisninger Østgrønland
Gazetteer of Greenland
Uninhabited islands of Greenland
Sermersooq